Hassan Nader (born 8 July 1965) is a Moroccan former footballer who played as a striker.

He spent most of his 21-year senior career in Portugal – amassing Primeira Liga totals of 219 matches and 94 goals – mainly with Farense, where he surpassed the 100-goal mark in official games.

Club career
Born in Casablanca, Nader started his career with local Wydad AC before signing with La Liga club RCD Mallorca in 1990–91. At the end of his second season the Balearic Islands team were relegated, and he also had a run-in with manager Lorenzo Serra Ferrer during his spell.

In July 1992, Nader moved to S.C. Farense in the Primeira Liga, becoming the league's top scorer in the 1994–95 campaign with 21 goals and being influential in the Algarve side's qualification to the UEFA Cup. During eight years, he played in the team alongside compatriot Hajry Redouane.

Nader later joined S.L. Benfica, but only appeared sparingly throughout two seasons and returned to Farense, where he would remain until his 2004 retirement at the age of 39, as the club was relegated to the fourth tier Terceira Divisão – he netted 11 league goals in his final year.

International career
A senior Moroccan international on 15 occasions, Nader played at the 1994 FIFA World Cup, scoring against the Netherlands in a 1–2 group stage loss, and at the 1992 Africa Cup of Nations.

Personal life
Nader's son, Mohcine, was also a footballer and a striker. Already born in Portugal, he too spent most of his career in that country.

References

External links

1965 births
Living people
Moroccan footballers
Footballers from Casablanca
Association football forwards
Botola players
Wydad AC players
La Liga players
RCD Mallorca players
Primeira Liga players
Liga Portugal 2 players
Segunda Divisão players
S.C. Farense players
S.L. Benfica footballers
Morocco international footballers
1988 African Cup of Nations players
1992 African Cup of Nations players
1994 FIFA World Cup players
Moroccan expatriate footballers
Expatriate footballers in Spain
Expatriate footballers in Portugal
Moroccan expatriate sportspeople in Spain
Portuguese people of Moroccan descent